Railroadiana or railwayana refers to artifacts of currently or formerly operating railways around the world. Railroadiana can include items such as:

 Brakeman's or marker lanterns
 Date nails, rail spikes, or short sections of rail
 Dining car linens, holloware, cutlery, or porcelain
 Locomotive nameplates or builder's plates
 Promotional or advertising materials from railway passenger and freight service
 Public or employee timetables
 Railroad hand tools such as wrenches, shovels, or brakeman's clubs
 Railroad switch stands or keys
 Sleeping car linens
 Station signs and railway signals
 Trackside signs such as mile post markers, whistle posts, or flanger signs
 Train dispatching forms and train orders
 Train horns and whistles

There are many more types of railroadiana available to the collector. Some railroadiana collectors include items in their collections as large as speeders or complete passenger cars.

The majority of pieces forming a collection can be legally obtained, often but not always at low cost, from either surplus or scrap sales from the railroad companies themselves, or through aftermarket railroadiana shows. Highly desirable items (rare or from popular lines) may sell for significant multiples of their original price.

See also 
 Private railroad car
 Private railway station

Collecting
Rail transport preservation
Memorabilia